Union of India or Indian Union may refer to:

 The country of India
 Dominion of India (1947–1950)
 The Government of India, whose legal name is "Union of India" as per Article 300 of the Indian constitution
 Political integration of India